Mamadou Coulibaly (born 27 July 1985) is a Malian footballer who plays as a forward for Adama City and the Mali national team.

International career
Diarra made his professional debut with the Mali national team in a 1–0 2014 African Nations Championship qualification loss to Guinea on 28 July 2013.

References

External links
 
 
 

1985 births
Living people
Sportspeople from Bamako
Malian footballers
Mali international footballers
Association football forwards
Stade Malien players
Malian Première Division players
Botola players
Al-Hilal Club (Omdurman) players
Ethiopian Premier League players
Malian expatriate footballers
Malian expatriate sportspeople in Morocco
Malian expatriate sportspeople in Sudan
Malian expatriate sportspeople in the United Arab Emirates
Malian expatriate sportspeople in Ethiopia
Expatriate footballers in Morocco
Expatriate footballers in Sudan
Expatriate footballers in the United Arab Emirates
Expatriate footballers in Ethiopia
2016 African Nations Championship players
2020 African Nations Championship players
21st-century Malian people
Mali A' international footballers